The 2014–15 North Carolina Tar Heels men's basketball team represented the University of North Carolina at Chapel Hill during the 2014–15 NCAA Division I men's basketball season. The team's head coach was Roy Williams, who was in his 12th season as UNC's head men's basketball coach. They played their home games at the Dean Smith Center as members of the Atlantic Coast Conference. They finished the season 26–12, 11–7 in ACC play to finish in fifth place. They advanced to the championship game of the ACC tournament where they lost to Notre Dame. They received an at-large bid to the NCAA tournament where they defeated Harvard in the second round and Arkansas in the third round before losing in the Sweet Sixteen to eventual runner-up Wisconsin.

Previous season
The Tar Heels finished the season 24–10, 13–5 in ACC play to finish in a tie for third place. They lost in the quarterfinals of the ACC tournament to Pittsburgh. They received an at-large bid to the NCAA tournament where they defeated Providence in the second round before losing in the third round to Iowa State.

Departures

Pre-season 
The Tar Heels entered the 2014–15 season lost two starters from the previous season as James Michael McAdoo and P. J. Hairston declared for the 2014 NBA draft.  However, rising juniors and potential draft picks Kennedy Meeks and Isaiah Hicks decided to return to Chapel Hill and UNC brought in a strong recruiting class including McDonald's All-Americans Justin Jackson, Theo Pinson and Joel Berry.

Class of 2014 signees

Roster

Schedule and results

|-
!colspan=12 style="background:#56A0D3; color:#FFFFFF;"| Exhibition

|-
!colspan=12 style="background:#56A0D3; color:#FFFFFF;"| Non-conference regular season

|-
!colspan=12 style="background:#56A0D3; color:#FFFFFF;"| ACC regular season

|-
!colspan=12 style="background:#56A0D3; color:#FFFFFF;"| ACC Tournament

|-
!colspan=12 style="background:#56A0D3; color:#FFFFFF;"| NCAA tournament

Rankings

Players drafted into the NBA

References

North Carolina Tar Heels men's basketball seasons
North Carolina
North Carolina
Tar
Tar